Dr Charles Kearns Deane Tanner (20 September 1849 – 21 April 1901) was an Irish surgeon and politician.

Dr. Charles Kearns Deane-Tanner was the uncle of early Hollywood director William Cunningham Deane-Tanner, better known as William Desmond Taylor.

Life
Tanner was born in Cork, the son of notable surgeon Dr. William Kearns Deane-Tanner and Eliza Sharpe, educated in Paris and Winchester, and studied arts and medicine at Queen's College, Cork and the Universities of Leipzig and Berlin. He practised as a surgeon at South Cork Infirmary and County Hospital and lectured on anatomy at Queen's College.

In the general election of 1885, Tanner was elected Irish Parliamentary Party MP for the Mid Cork constituency, and was re-elected unopposed for the seat until his death. Like other activists for Home Rule, his involvement in Parliament was controversial, as his behaviour was often obstructive. The Times remarked after his death that "it was difficult to regard him as a serious politician ... he came repeatedly under the censure of the Speaker".

The Church Standard remarked that "there was scarcely a session that he did not make a fierce attack upon the ministry" and he "was credited with the record of having been more frequently "suspended" from the House of Commons for violent speech than any other member of the body". He was actively involved in the Plan of Campaign, and was a supporter of Parnell until Parnell made an adverse comment about Tanner's father. When the Parnell split occurred, Tanner joined the Anti-Parnellite Irish National Federation. Tanner's politics were at odds with many in his Anglo-Irish family. This caused quite a bit of controversy within the family.

Death
He died in 1901 of consumption and was buried at Kensal Green Cemetery, London next to the grave of his brother Dr. Lombard John Newman Deane-Tanner.

Notes

External links 

1849 births
1901 deaths
Irish Parliamentary Party MPs
Anti-Parnellite MPs
United Irish League
Members of the Parliament of the United Kingdom for County Cork constituencies (1801–1922)
UK MPs 1885–1886
UK MPs 1886–1892
UK MPs 1892–1895
UK MPs 1895–1900
UK MPs 1900–1906
Irish surgeons